The Oratory of San Bernardino is an oratory in the city of Perugia in Italy, located on piazza San Francesco next to the basilica of San Francesco al Prato. Dedicated to saint Bernardino of Siena and completed in 1452, it is notable for its 1457-61 multi-coloured façade covered in reliefs by the Renaissance artist Agostino di Duccio.

Bibliography
AA.VV., Umbria ("Guida rossa"), Touring Club editore, Milano 1999, p. 149. 

Roman Catholic churches in Perugia
1452 establishments in Europe
15th-century establishments in Italy
Roman Catholic churches completed in 1452
15th-century Roman Catholic church buildings in Italy